Anton Andersson (born 12 March 1981) is a Swedish triple jumper.

He competed at the 2005 European Indoor Championships and the 2007 World Championships, but without reaching the final round.

His personal best jump is 17.10 metres, achieved when he became Swedish champion in August 2007 in Eskilstuna.

References

1981 births
Living people
Swedish male triple jumpers
Örgryte IS Friidrott athletes
People from Luleå
Sportspeople from Norrbotten County